Arouca (originally San Agustín de Arouca) is a town in the East–West Corridor of Trinidad and Tobago located  east of Port of Spain, along the Eastern Main Road. It is located west of Arima, east of Tunapuna and Tacarigua, south of Lopinot, and north of Piarco. It is governed by the Tunapuna–Piarco Regional Corporation. Arouca may be a corruption of Arauca, an Amerindian tribe.

During most of the Spanish rule, Arouca was a settlement reserved for Amerindians. However, when the French arrived in 1783 under Governor José María Chacón's Cedula de Repoblación the Amerindians were restricted to Arima. Most of the land in Arouca was split between the Tablau and Chaumet families. Arouca steadily grew into a major agricultural center, but the extension of the railroad to Sangre Grande in 1898 lured many people in Arouca to relocate to the more prosperous Sangre Grande valley.

Today, it mainly comprises residential housing. There are several schools located in Arouca including the Bon Air Primary School, Arouca Anglican Primary School, Arouca Girls R.C., Arouca Boys R.C., Arouca Government Primary Schools and Bon Air High School.

Arouca is home to four prisons and one correctional facility. These include the Golden Grove Prison, Remand Prison, Women's Prison and Youth Training and Rehabilitation Centre.

Prominent people from Arouca
 George Padmore
 Henry Sylvester Williams
 Jaswick Taylor
 Learie Constantine
 Pundit Teeluckdharry Upadayya

Gallery

References

External links
 Arouca Community Mailing list
 Arouca's Main Website

Populated places in Trinidad and Tobago